Anton Chekhov's The Duel is a 2010 film directed by Dover Kosashvili.  The film is an adaptation of an 1891 novella by Anton Chekhov, "The Duel". Set in a seaside resort in the Caucasus, the story centers on Laevsky (Andrew Scott), an aristocratic civil servant, and his mistress Nadya (Fiona Glascott), whom Laevsky is trying to abandon.  The screenplay was written by Mary Bing. The Duel was filmed in Croatia. The film's cast is made up of British and Irish actors.  It has generally received positive reviews.

Plot 
Ivan Andreitch Laevsky is an educated Russian aristocrat who has run off with a married woman, Nadyezyhda Fyodorovna (Nadya), to the Black sea. He got a job in the civil service, but is careless about his work, mostly drinking and playing cards. By now he has fallen out of love and is bored with Nadya, who is having affairs with other men, and he wants to leave her. He receives a letter telling him that Nadya's husband has died (and therefore she is free to marry him). But he hides the letter in a book and doesn't tell Nadya. That, he says, would be like inviting her to marry him.

Laevsky confides his problem with Alexandr Daviditch Samoylenko, a military doctor, who has befriended Laevsky and looks after him. Samoylenko urges Laevsky to marry Nadya, even if he doesn't love her. Laevsky says he cannot marry a woman he has no feeling for. But he cannot leave her because she has no money, no relatives, and no means to survive. Samoylenko says that if he must leave her, he must do so humanely, by giving her enough money to live on. Laevsky says he is 2000 roubles in debt and cannot afford to do that.

Samoylenko has two boarders in his house, and they discuss philosophy, science and literature around the dinner table and elsewhere. One boarder is Nikolay Vassilitch Von Koren, a zoologist. The other boarder is a deacon in the Russian church. The doctor, the zoologist, and the deacon discuss the new ideas of evolution. In a friendly discussion, the deacon says that man was descended from God. Von Koren says that man was descended from the ape. He explains how the fitter animals survive to pass on descendants, and the weaker animals die off. Von Koren gives Laevsky as an example of a man who is not fit to survive. When Laevsky came to the town, he taught everyone bad habits. First, playing cards. Second, drinking beer. Third, openly living with another man's wife, rather than being discreet about adultery like the townspeople. Fourth, he is a debtor. Von Koren says that Laevsky should not be permitted to reproduce, otherwise there would be worthless Laevskies all over Russia. Laveski is like a microbe, that you would not hesitate to kill. Von Koren says he would like to kill Laveski himself, as you would kill vermin. Samoylenko and the deacon reject these ideas, Samoylenko arguing from feelings of compassion and the deacon arguing from the love taught by Christ. Samoylenko is offended by Von Koren's insulting his friend, Laevsky. They reject his "German" ideas.

Laevsky decides to leave the town for Petersburg. He says that he will go first and send for Nadya after he is settled, but Samoylenko and Von Koren know that this will be his way to abandon her. But he has no money, so he asks Samoylenko to loan him 100 roubles. Samoylenko agrees, but doesn't have 100 roubles, so he tells Laevsky he will have to borrow it in turn from a third party. After Laevsky leaves, Samoylenko asks Von Koren (his boarder) to advance him 100 roubles. Von Koren gives Samoylenko 100 roubles, but on the condition that Laevsky agrees to take Nadya with him to Petersburg.

Laevsky returns a day later to try to get the money. Von Koren treats him contemptuously, and refers to his "problems." Laevsky becomes furious, and accuses Samoylenko of revealing his personal matters. Samoylenko indignantly denies it. Laevetsky tells them to leave him alone, or "I will fight you." Von Koren twists this to mean a challenge to a duel, and accepts. Laevsky agrees, their friends cannot talk them out of it, and they make arrangements for a duel with pistols.

Meanwhile, Nadya is pursued by Kirilin, the police captain. They once had sex, which she calls "a mistake," and Kirilin is blackmailing Nadya into having sex with him again with a threat of exposing her. She cries and begs him but finally agrees to meet him again that night and one more night. Atchmianov, the son of the shopkeeper where Nadya buys her clothes, was also pursuing Nadya, but she rejected him. He finds out about her assignation with Kirilin.

The night before the duel, Laevsky is drinking and playing cards. Atchmianov tells Laevsky to follow him to meet someone about "very important business." He leads Laevsky to the room where Kirilin and Nadya are having sex. Laevsky goes home even more upset about Nadya than about the duel.

Laevsky is still upset the morning of the duel. Their friends try to talk them into forgiving each other, and Laevsky agrees and apologizes, but Von Koren, despite their entreaties, insists on going through. Laevsky's hands shake, and he deliberately fires into the air. Von Koren, who is a practiced pistol shot, takes aim at Laevsky's head. Meanwhile, the Russian Orthodox deacon, who has been hurrying to the scene, appears over a hill and shouts. Von Koren fires and misses Laevsky.

They go home, and Laevsky finally recovers. He falls in love with Nadya again. Three weeks later, they have been married, and Laevsky is transformed. He is working hard to pay off his debts. Von Koren is finally leaving. He is amazed at Laevsky's transformation, and says that if Laevsky had been like this originally, they could have been good friends. He stops by Laevsky's house before he leaves. Laevsky and Nadya greet him warmly, he shakes hands, and they say emotional goodbyes.

Cast
 Andrew Scott as Laevsky
 Fiona Glascott as Nadya
 Tobias Menzies as Von Koren
 Niall Buggy as Samoylenko
 Rik Makarem as Atchmianov
 Nicholas Rowe as Sheshkovsky
 Michelle Fairley as Marya
 Simon Trinder as Postal Superintendent
 Debbie Chazen as Olga
 Graham Turner as Atchmianov Senior
 Jeremy Swift as Deacon

Reception 
Rotten Tomatoes gives the film a score of 81% based on 26 reviews, with an average rating of 7 out of 10.
Metacritic gives the film a score of 75% based on reviews from 16 critics.

Notes

External links
 Official site
 
 
 

2010 films
2010 drama films
2010s American films
2010s English-language films
American drama films
Films about duels
Films based on works by Anton Chekhov
Films directed by Dover Kosashvili
Films shot in Croatia
Black Sea in fiction